Chad Oliver Scott (born September 6, 1974) is a former American football cornerback. Scott was a first round pick, 24th overall, by the Pittsburgh Steelers in the 1997 NFL Draft. He played professionally for the Pittsburgh Steelers and the New England Patriots. He played college football at Maryland.

Early life
Scott was born in Capitol Heights, Maryland and graduated from Suitland High School in Forestville, Maryland. He attended Towson University and the University of Maryland where he was a kinesiological sciences major.

Professional career
Chad Scott was drafted by the Pittsburgh Steelers as the 24th pick in the first round of the 1997 NFL Draft. He had 21 interceptions, with four of them returned for touchdowns during his career. He was released by the Steelers on February 25, 2005. He was signed by the New England Patriots as a free agent on April 26, 2005. Scott suffered a knee injury during the first week of 2007 training camp and was placed on Injured Reserve by the Patriots. He did not play in the 1998 or 2007 seasons due to injury. He played in 108 games over nine seasons in the National Football League.

NFL statistics

References

External links 
 
 databaseFootball.com
 Pro-Football-Reference.Com
 SI.com

1974 births
Living people
American football cornerbacks
African-American players of American football
Maryland Terrapins football players
New England Patriots players
People from Capitol Heights, Maryland
People from Forestville, Maryland
Pittsburgh Steelers players
Players of American football from Maryland
Sportspeople from the Washington metropolitan area
Towson Tigers football players
21st-century African-American sportspeople
20th-century African-American sportspeople
Ed Block Courage Award recipients